Gustav Heinrich Johann Apollon Tammann ( – 17 December 1938) was a prominent Baltic German chemist-physicist who made important contributions in the fields of glassy and solid solutions, heterogeneous equilibria, crystallization, and metallurgy.

Biography 
Tamman was born in Yamburg (now Kingisepp, Leningrad Oblast). His father, Heinrich Tammann (1833–1864) was of Estonian peasant origin and his mother, Matilda Schünmann, was of German origin. Tamman graduated from University of Dorpat in chemistry. He came to Göttingen University in 1903 where he established the first Institute of Inorganic Chemistry in Germany. In 1908 he was appointed director of the Physico-Chemical Institute. His interests focused on the physics and physical chemistry of metals and alloys (metallurgy). In 1925 Tammann was awarded Liebig Medal. On 28 May 1936, Tammann was awarded the Eagle Shield of the German Empire, with dedication "The Doyen of German Metallurgy". He also known for the Vogel-Fulcher-Tammann equation, and the Tait-Tammann equation of state which seeks to account for the compressibility of liquids.

Tammann died  in Göttingen at age 77.

Awards 
Tammann was awarded the following prizes:

 Liebig Medal of the Association of German Chemists in 1925
 Heyn Medal of the German Society for Materials Science in 1929
 Eagle Shield of the German Empire in 1936

The Tammann Commemorative Medal of the Deutsche Gesellschaft für Materialkunde is named after him.

Bibliography

References

External links
 

1861 births
1938 deaths
People from Kingisepp
Baltic-German people
German metallurgists
Russian metallurgists
Physical chemists
University of Tartu alumni
Academic staff of the University of Tartu
Academic staff of the University of Göttingen
Corresponding members of the Saint Petersburg Academy of Sciences
Corresponding Members of the Russian Academy of Sciences (1917–1925)
Corresponding Members of the USSR Academy of Sciences
Honorary Members of the USSR Academy of Sciences